Bhangala is a village of Punjab, India.

Bhangala may also refer to:
 Bhangala, Jalandhar, a village in Phillaur in Jalandhar district, India

See also
 Bhanga Bazar, Karimganj district, Assam
 Bhangaha, Mahottari District, Province No. 2, Nepal
 Bhangal Kalan, a village in Shaheed Bhagat Singh Nagar district, Punjab, India
 Bhangara, Nepal, Parbat District, Dhawalagiri Zone, Nepal